Sauthier is a surname. Notable people with the surname include:

Ademar Agostinho Sauthier (born 1940), Brazilian Roman Catholic priest and theologian
Anthony Sauthier (born 1991), Swiss footballer
Claude J. Sauthier (1736–1802), French illustrator, draftsman, surveyor and mapmaker
Jacques Sauthier (1905–?), Swiss boxer
Louis Sauthier (1902–?), Swiss boxer